Rabiner is a surname. Notable people with the surname include:

 Igor Rabiner (born 1973), Russian journalist
 Lawrence Rabiner (born 1943), American electrical engineer